The 1989 Virginia Tech Hokies football team represented the Virginia Polytechnic Institute and State University during the 1989 NCAA Division I-A football season. The team's head coach was Frank Beamer.

Schedule

Game summaries

at West Virginia

Florida State

References

Virginia Tech
Virginia Tech Hokies football seasons
Virginia Tech Hokies football